Tarichea is a genus of shield bugs belonging to the family Plataspidae, containing the single species, T. chinensis.

References

Shield bugs
Pentatomomorpha genera
Monotypic Hemiptera genera